Jeroen Paul Thesseling (born 13 April 1971) is a Dutch fretless bass player, most famous for his work in the German progressive death metal band Obscura and the Dutch progressive death metal band Pestilence.

Biography

Early life
Jeroen started studying violin and followed his first lessons at the age of 7. During his youth he played with classical orchestras, ensembles and attended several classical music contests. At the age of 16 he switched to bass guitar.

Professional career
Thesseling began studying bass in 1988 at the ArtEZ School of Music in Enschede, Netherlands. Between 1992 and 1994, he was a member of Pestilence, with whom he recorded the jazz fusion-influenced album Spheres. In 1995 Jeroen started to study microtonality, which resulted in two pieces: Hafnium — study in 72-tone equal temperament (1999) — and Argon — study in 18-tone equal temperament (2000). The period following, Arabic microtonal and contemporary classical music inspired him to focus primarily on fretless bass. In 2005 he recorded his first fretless work with the studio group Ensemble Salazhar. Despite their highly acclaimed demo Colors the group never officially released recordings. Between 2007 and 2011, he collaborated with Obscura and recorded with them Cosmogenesis (2009) and Omnivium (2011). Between 2009 and 2012, he rejoined Pestilence after a 15-year break and recorded their sixth studio album Doctrine (2011). Since 2011, he has played exclusively fretless 7-string basses built by German bass luthier Warwick; they are strung with a subcontra F#-tuning (F#0–B0–E1–A1–D2–G2–C3). In late 2014, he founded the jazz fusion group Salazh Trio featuring legendary Cuban drummer/percussionist Horacio Hernández. Their debut work Circulations was released in December 2017. In October 2019, he founded the fusion-world-metal group Quadvium with fellow fretless bass player Steve Di Giorgio. In April 2020, it was revealed that he rejoined the German progressive death metal band Obscura as a permanent bass player after a nine-year break. With them he recorded their sixth studio album A Valediction (2021). Jeroen Paul Thesseling lives in Amsterdam, The Netherlands.

Equipment

Jeroen endorses Warwick basses and has played Warwick Thumb NT series exclusively since 1993. He has played several Thumb NT6 and NT7 basses, each marking different chapters of his musical career. During Pestilence's Spheres era, he played a Thumb NT6 bass. Later on he started using fretless Thumb NT6 basses, for Obscura's Cosmogenesis and Omnivium era. In 2011 he started playing custom shop Thumb NT7 fretless basses, which are most notably heard on the recording of Pestilence's Doctrine album, Obscura's A Valediction album and Sadist's Firescorched album.

Warwick 7-string basses (customshop)

 Warwick Thumb NT7 fretless Ebony fingerboard (2017)
 Warwick Thumb NT7 fretless Snakewood fingerboard (2013)
 Warwick Thumb NT7 fretless Ebony fingerboard (2011)

Warwick 6-string basses

 Warwick Thumb NT6 fretless Macassar Ebony fingerboard (1993)
 Warwick Thumb NT6 fretless Ebony fingerboard (1991)
 Warwick Thumb NT6 Wenge fretboard (1991)
 Warwick Thumb NT6 fretless Asian Ebony fingerboard (1989)
 Warwick Thumb NT6 Wenge fretboard (1989)

Live amplification

 Warwick LWA 1000, WCA 115 CE LW cab, WCA 115 CE LW cab (left)
 Warwick LWA 1000, WCA 115 CE LW cab, WCA 115 CE LW cab (right)

Recording gear

 Phoenix Audio DRSQ4 MkII dual channel preamp
 Aurora Audio GTQ2 MkIII dual channel preamp

Discography

Studio

 Sadist – Firescorched (2022, Agonia Records)
 Obscura – A Valediction (2021, Nuclear Blast)
 Salazh Trio – Circulations (2017, Salazh Trio)
 Obscura – Omnivium (2011, Relapse Records)
 Pestilence – Doctrine (2011, Mascot Records)
 MaYaN – Quarterpast (2011, Nuclear Blast)
 Obscura – Cosmogenesis (2009, Relapse Records)
 Pestilence – Spheres (1993, Roadrunner Records)

Live

 Pestilence – Presence of the Past (2015, Marquee Records)

Compilations

 Pestilence – Twisted Truth (2020, Warner Music Group)
 Pestilence – Prophetic Revelations (2018, Hammerheart Records)
 Pestilence – Reflections of the Mind (2016, Vic Records)
 Lange Frans – Levenslied (2012, TopNotch)
 Pestilence – Mind Reflections (1994, Roadrunner Records)

Videography

Official music videos

 Obscura – Heritage (2022)
 Obscura – The Neuromancer (2022)
 Sadist – Accabadora (2022)
 Obscura – When Stars Collide (2021)
 Obscura – Devoured Usurper (2021)
 Obscura – A Valediction (2021)
 Obscura – Solaris (2021)
 Obscura – Anticosmic Overload (2009)
 Pestilence – Mind Reflections (1993)

References

External links
 Official website

Living people
1971 births
Obscura (band) members
Pestilence (band) members
Death metal musicians
Dutch heavy metal bass guitarists
21st-century bass guitarists
Mayan (band) members